Barbara S. Ottaway is a British archaeologist. She was previously a Reader in Archaeology in the Department of Archaeology, University of Sheffield, and Professor in Archaeology at the University of Exeter. Her research primarily focusses on early copper metallurgy and the prehistory of central and south-eastern Europe. Ottaway has also written on her experiences growing up in Nazi-era Germany. She has been noted as an influential figure in the study of archaeometallurgy, metals analysis, and experimental archaeology.

Early life and education 
Barbara was born in Dresden in 1938 and spent the war years in Saxony, East Germany, before crossing over to West Germany in 1947 and later studying in West Berlin.

Academic career 
After working in German research laboratories, Barbara moved to Edinburgh in the early 1960s for employment within the biochemistry research laboratories of the university. While at Edinburgh, Ottaway's early research in archaeology focussed on radiocarbon dating and dendrochronology. She became a Reader in Archaeology in the Department of Archaeology, University of Sheffield in the early 1990s and developed a greater focus on early metallurgy, and specifically copper metallurgy, in central and south-eastern Europe. While at Sheffield, Ottaway's developed field projects including excavations and surveys in southern Germany and Austria, and undertook extensive research in the application of experimental archaeology in archaeometallurgical research.

After taking a position at the University of Exeter, she consolidated research on socketed axes  and sat on the Advisory Boards at the Mining Museum in Bochum, Germany and of HiMAT (History of Mining Activities in the Tyrol and Adjacent Areas) in Austria since its inception in 2005. She retired in the early 2000s.

Selected publications 
 Ottaway, B.S. and Mehta, R. 2015. Memories Unlocked Befreite Erinnerungen.
 Heeb, J. and Ottaway, B.S. 2014. Experimental Archaeometallurgy in B.W. Roberts & C. P. Thornton (eds), Archaeometallurgy in Global Perspective. Methods and Syntheses. Springer, p. 161-192
Ottaway, B.S. 1999. A Changing Place: The Galgenberg in Lower Bavaria from the fifth to the first millennium BC, BAR International Series 752.
Ottaway, B.S. (ed.) 1983. Archaeology, dendrochronology and the radiocarbon calibration curve. Edinburgh: University Department of Archaeology Occasional Paper No. 9

References 

1938 births
Living people
People from Dresden
British archaeologists
British women archaeologists
Academics of the University of Sheffield
Academics of the University of Exeter